Jogendranagar is a census town in West Tripura district in the Indian state of Tripura. Jogendranagar has the only railway station after Agartala railway station, in Agartala.

Demographics
 India census, Jogendranagar had a population of 34,844. Males constitute 51% of the population and females 49%. Jogendranagar has an average literacy rate of 74%, higher than the national average of 59.5%: male literacy is 79%, and female literacy is 69%. In Jogendranagar, 11% of the population is under 6 years of age.

References

Cities and towns in West Tripura district
West Tripura district